Neramu Siksha is a 1973 Indian Telugu-language drama film directed by K. Viswanath who co-wrote the film with M. Balayya. The film is an adaptation of Fyodor Dostoevsky's Crime and Punishment (1866). The film received positive reviews from critics. The film was remade in Tamil as Needhikku Thalaivanangu (1976) and in Hindi as Shikshaa (1979).

Plot
Vijay is the son of a rich business couple, Rajasekharam and Santamma. Bharathi is also a daughter of another rich man, Narayana Rao. Krishna has grown up without knowing or facing any problems and gets a new car. While driving in competition with his friend Satyam, he accidentally kills Chinnayya's brother and blinds Chinnayya. Somehow this incident comes to the knowledge of Rajasekharam and he confronts Vijay and throws him out of house.

Vijay then ends up as one of the servants at Narayana Rao's home. He also gets to know Chinnayya and his family. He realizes the intensity of his mistake and vows to make Chinnayya and his family's life better. Chinnayya on the other hand, vows to kill the person responsible for his brother's death and his blindness. Knowing about his fate in the hands of Chinnayya, Vijay keeps helping them. Finally, Chinnayya learns about Vijay and forgives him.

Cast

Soundtrack
 "Chesina Papam Needi Chitikina Bratukinkokaridi" (Lyrics: Devulapalli Krishnasastri) – S.P. Balasubrahmanyam
 "Daagudu Muta Dandakor"- S.P. Balasubrahmanyam, B.R. Latha, Bhaskar Sr
 "Emandi Saaru O Batlaru Doragaru"- S.P. Balasubrahmanyam, S. Janaki
 "One Two One Two" - S. P. Balasubrahmanyam, G. Anand
 "Ramuni Bantunura"- S. P. Balasubrahmanyam
 "Vesavu Bhale Veshalu" - P. Susheela

References

1973 films
Indian black-and-white films
1970s Telugu-language films
Films directed by K. Viswanath
Telugu films remade in other languages
Films based on Crime and Punishment
Films based on works by Fyodor Dostoyevsky